Wohl may refer to:

Chemistry 

 Wohl–Aue reaction
 Wohl degradation
 Wohl equation
 Wohl–Ziegler bromination

People 
Wohl is a spelling of Wahl, which corresponds to English well from German Language well or sure. Also from Polish elected.

 Aleksandar Wohl (born 1963), Australian chess player
 Alfred Wohl (1863–1939), German chemist
 Brian Wohl (born 1972), known by his ring name Julio Dinero, American professional wrestler
 Cecília Wohl (1862–1939), Hungarian philanthropist
 Daniel Wohl (born 1980), French composer
 Dave Wohl (born 1949), American former NBA player and  coach
 David Wohl (actor) (born 1953), American actor
 David Wohl, American comic book writer and editor
 Eddie Wohl, American record producer and member of rock music ensemble World Fire Brigade
 Ellen Wohl (born 1962), American fluvial geomorphologist
 Herman Wohl (1877–1936), American composer
 Ira Wohl, American documentary filmmaker
 Jacob Wohl (born 1997), American far-right conspiracy theorist, fraudster, and Internet troll
 Jeanette Wohl (1783–1861), German correspondent and heir of Ludwig Börne
 Louis de Wohl (1903–1961), Hungarian astrologer and writer
 Martin Wohl (died 2009), American transportation economist
 Mary Ellen Wohl (1932–2009), American pulmonologist
 Maurice Wohl (1923–2007), British philanthropist
 Paul Wohl (1901–1985), German journalist and political commentator
 Richard Wohl (1921–1957), American sociologist

Places 
 Wohl Centre, at Bar-Ilan University in Ramat Gan]], Israel
 Wohl Rose Park, a public garden in Givat Ram, Jerusalem

Other uses 
 Western Ontario Hockey League, an ice hockey league that existed from 1969 to 2007
 WOHL-CD, a television station (channel 15, virtual channel 35) licensed to serve Lima, Ohio, United States